The World Day of laziness (festival) is the closing day of the Festival of Industry, Trade and Culture held in the city of Itagüi - Colombia. This social and cultural festival presents many genres of music: jazz, blues, salsa, rock, hip-hop, reggaeton, vallenato, electronic music, reggae and pop. In addition, the festival features photography exhibitions, painting, dance, musical and theater.

History

The World Day of Laziness was founded in 1984 to mark the closing day of the Festival of Industry, Trade and Culture. Its ethos suggests that the modern world needs to relax and learn to enjoy art, culture, and rest. 

In 2012 the World Day of Laziness began to be recognized internationally.

See also

List of music festivals in Colombia
List of pop festivals
Festival of Industry, Trade and Culture
Musical theatre
Itagüí
Medellín

References

External links

Fairs in Colombia
Music festivals in Colombia
Music festivals established in 1984
Rock festivals in Colombia
Pop music festivals